Sarah Victoria M Tansey (born 1971 Wimbledon, London) is a British actress. She had a role in Heartbeat as pharmacist Jenny Merton (née Latimer) who was brought in to help Dr Summerbee (Clare Calbraith) in the Aidensfield surgery. When Dr Summerbee was killed off, Jenny continued as the pharmacist alongside Dr Merrick, but she developed mental health symptoms and was diagnosed with mania, which was Sarah and Duncan Bell’s (Dennis Merton) exit storyline. Other roles included the shows Casualty, Where the Heart Is and The Bill. She has also appeared in films Far from the Madding Crowd (1998) and Beginner's Luck (2001). She is married to actor Hywel Simons.

External links
 

British actresses
People from Wimbledon, London
1972 births
Living people